Perbrinckia integra is a species of freshwater crabs of the family Gecarcinucidae that is endemic to Sri Lanka. The species is categorized as vulnerable by founders due to habitat destruction and human interference. The species is found around Adam's Peak area only. It is found, and known to live under moist rocks, and near water sources.

References

Gecarcinucoidea
Freshwater crustaceans of Asia
Crustaceans of Sri Lanka
Endemic fauna of Sri Lanka
Crustaceans described in 1995